This is a list of well-known dimensionless quantities illustrating their variety of forms and applications. The tables also include pure numbers, dimensionless ratios, or dimensionless physical constants; these topics are discussed in the article.

Biology and medicine

Chemistry

Physics

Physical constants

Fluids and heat transfer

Solids

Optics

Mathematics and statistics

Geography, geology and geophysics

Sport

Other fields

References